Lucas Monzón may refer to:
 Lucas Monzón (Argentine footballer) (born 1996), Argentine football defender
 Lucas Monzón (Uruguayan footballer) (born 2001), Uruguayan football defender